Hridhayam Paadunnu is a 1980 Indian Malayalam film,  directed by Gulab Prem Kumar. The film stars Sukumari, Jagathy Sreekumar, Jose and Jalaja in the lead roles. The film has musical score by K. J. Joy.

Cast
Sukumari
Jagathy Sreekumar
Jose
Jalaja
Jayamalini
M. G. Soman
Rajani Sharma
Ravikumar
Roopa

Soundtrack
The music was composed by K. J. Joy and the lyrics were written by Yusufali Kechery.

References

External links
 

1980 films
1980s Malayalam-language films
Films scored by K. J. Joy